HF, Hf or hf can refer to:

Arts and entertainment
 HammerFall, a Swedish power metal band
 Hard-Fi, an English indie rock band
 Star Trek: Hidden Frontier, a long-running Star Trek fan-fiction series
 Hi-hat with foot, part of a drum kit

Business
Hlutafélag (hf.), a form of limited liability company in Iceland
 Hapag-Lloyd Flug, a German airline (former IATA code) doing business as TUIfly
 Air Côte d'Ivoire, an Ivorian airline (IATA code)
 Hedge fund

Education
 Higher Preparatory Examination (HF) (Højere Forberedelseseksamen), a Danish examination programme
 Heraldo Filipino, the student newspaper of De La Salle University-Dasmariñas, Cavite, Philippines
 Homewood-Flossmoor High School, Flossmoor, Illinois

Organizations
 Humanity First, an international charitable organisation, which focuses on immediate disaster response and long-term development
 Health trust (Helseforetak), a Norwegian hospital enterprise
 Heritage Front, a white supremacist and Canadian Nationalist group
 Hudobný fond (Music Fund Slovakia), a presenter of the ZAI Awards

Science and technology

Biology and medicine
 Heart failure
 Holstein Friesian cattle, HF, a breed of cattle
 Steve Biko Academic Hospital, a hospital in Pretoria, South Africa, formerly called H F Verwoerd Hospital
 Hippocampal formation, region in the brain

Chemistry
 Hafnium, symbol Hf, a chemical element
 Hartree–Fock method, a calculation scheme in the field of computational chemistry
 Hydrogen fluoride, HF, a diatomic compound which can dissolve in water to form hydrofluoric acid, a highly corrosive solution
 Hydrofluoric acid, HF(aq), a solution of hydrogen fluoride (HF) in water

Other uses in science and technology
 Handsfree, equipment that can be used without the use of hands
 Helicon Filter, photo editing software
 Helicon Focus, a photo-merging program used to increase depth of field or make panoramas
 High frequency, the ITU 3–30 MHz radio frequency range (band)

Sport
 Half-Forward, an Australian Rules football position
 Heinz Field, a stadium in Pittsburgh, Pennsylvania and the home of the Pittsburgh Steelers

People
 H. F. Verwoerd, a South African Prime Minister
Harrison Ford, American film actor

Other uses
 Have Fun, in video game slang
 High five, celebratory hand gesture
 Hotfix, a software patch to temporarily fix a bug in a product

See also 

 High fidelity